Walter Miller (1890–1959) was an American jockey.

Miller was born in Brooklyn, New York.

He rode in his first race at age 14. At the age of 16, he won 388 races, a record not broken until Anthony DeSpirito did it in 1952. Between the years 1905 and 1908 Miller won 1,094 races from 4,336 mounts for an extraordinary 25.2 winning percentage.  He led the U.S. in victories in both 1906 and 1907.

In 1906, he won the Preakness on Whimsical. He also won the Travers Stakes, Alabama Stakes, Champagne Stakes, Saratoga Special Stakes, and Brooklyn Handicap.

He was the United States National Riding Champion in 1906 and 1907.

In his career, more than half the time his horse finished "in the money". On July 29, 1906, Walter Miller rode five winners on a single racecard at Brighton Beach Race Course. He set a record by riding eight consecutive winners, over a two-day period at Benning Race Track.  His career ended in the United States after he gained weight as a late teenager. In 1909 and 1910 he rode primarily in Australia and Europe where weight restrictions were less stringent.

Walter  Miller was inducted into the U.S. Racing Racing Hall of Fame in 1955, into the Jockey Hall of Fame in 1957, and into the International Jewish Sports Hall of Fame in 1983.

External links
 Winning the Futurity, 1915 silent film made by the Walter Miller Feature Film Company

References

American jockeys
Sportspeople from Brooklyn
1890 births
1959 deaths
Jewish American sportspeople
United States Thoroughbred Racing Hall of Fame inductees
20th-century American Jews